Huzaifa Herbert Elliot (4 July 1918 – 14 August 1997) was a British novelist, screenwriter, director, and television producer active from 1954 until around 1993. Between 1954 and 1960, he scripted a succession of one-off television plays including War in the Air and A Man from the Sun. The latter was a pioneering work aimed at a West Indian audience. In 1961, he joined with astronomer Fred Hoyle to write another ground-breaking TV science fiction serial, A for Andromeda. The success of A For Andromeda prompted a sequel, The Andromeda Breakthrough, in 1962.

Following Andromeda, Elliot wrote more one-off plays for the BBC. He resigned from the corporation in 1963, though he would later work with them again, producing a concept for the 1965 drama series Mogul (renamed The Troubleshooters from the second series), later being credited as a writer on various episodes of the show.

His other works include programs such as Fall of Eagles and Survival as well as novels namely Duel and Blood Upon the Snow. He additionally worked with Fred Hoyle to produce novelisations of A For Andromeda and The Andromeda Breakthrough.

Writing credits

Awards and nominations

Books by John Elliot 
A for Andromeda (with Fred Hoyle), 1962, Souvenir Press, 
Andromeda Breakthrough (with Fred Hoyle), 1964, Souvenir Press; 1966, Corgi Books
MOGUL: The Making of a Myth, 1970, Barrie & Jenkins

Further reading 
MacKenzie, S. (2006), "War in the Air : Churchill, the Air Ministry and the BBC response to Victory at Sea", Contemporary British History

References

External links
 
 Obituary: John Elliot in The Independent
 

1918 births
1997 deaths
British male screenwriters
20th-century British novelists
British male novelists
20th-century British male writers
20th-century British screenwriters